Vulpes (aka Las VulpeSS) was the first Spanish all-female punk rock band, formed in Barakaldo (Greater Bilbao, Basque Country) in the summer of 1982. They became famous the following year when they appeared on TV programme Caja de Ritmos, performing their song "Me Gusta Ser una Zorra" ("I Like Being a Slut"). The song is a cover of The Stooges song "I Wanna Be Your Dog" with adapted Spanish lyrics. Many viewers complained about their performance, which led to a media scandal and court case.

To capitalise on the attention, the song was recorded and released as a single by Dos Rombos records, which went on to sell 12000 copies. However, legal difficulties created problems for the group on their promotional tour. The band dissolved in 1983 although they reformed briefly in 1985 to play some gigs.

Lupe Vázquez died in 1993. The remaining Vulpes reformed for a concert in 2005. An album of rerecordings, Me Gusta Ser, was released in 2006.

Members
 Loles Vázquez «Anarkoma Zorrita» - guitar
 Mamen Rodrigo «Evelyn Zorrita» - voice
 Begoña Astigarraga «Ruth Zorrita» - bass
 Lupe Vázquez «Pigüy Zorrita» - drums

Discography
 "Me Gusta Ser una Zorra" / "Inkisición" (7", dos Rombos ["Two Diamonds"], 1983). 
 Barbarela '83 (LP, Punk Away, 2012) 
 Me Gusta Ser (CD, Oihuka, 2006).

References

Sources
Álvaro Heras Gröh “Lluvia, Hierro y Rock&Roll”. Historia de las bandas de rock de Bilbao (Ediciones Sirimiri - Vudumedia)

External links
 Discogs entry
 "Me Gusta Ser una Zorra" video

Spanish punk rock groups
All-female punk bands